Ashlee+Evan is an American reality television series on E!. It stars Ashlee Simpson and Evan Ross.

Premise
Ashlee+Evan follows Ashlee Simpson and Evan Ross, son of Diana Ross, as they try to balance their lives as new parents and the pressures of living up to their famous family names.

Cast
 Ashlee Simpson
 Evan Ross

Episodes

References

External links
 

2010s American reality television series
2018 American television series debuts
Ashlee Simpson
E! original programming
English-language television shows
2018 American television series endings